Igor Radusinović (born 15 March 1984) is a Montenegrin retired footballer who played as a midfielder.  In 2015, he appeared in  two matches for PS Barito Putera in the Indonesia Super League.

Club career
He has played with several Montenegrin clubs, and with Serbian side FK Hajduk Kula.

Radusinović was signed by Barito Putera on December 20, 2014.

References

1984 births
Living people
Footballers from Podgorica
Association football defenders
Serbia and Montenegro footballers
Montenegrin footballers
FK Budućnost Podgorica players
FK Kom players
FK Crvena Stijena players
FK Hajduk Kula players
KF Vllaznia Shkodër players
FK Bokelj players
OFK Grbalj players
FK Rudar Pljevlja players
Hibernians F.C. players
OFK Titograd players
PS Barito Putera players
Second League of Serbia and Montenegro players
First League of Serbia and Montenegro players
Kategoria Superiore players
Montenegrin First League players
Maltese Premier League players
Liga 1 (Indonesia) players
Montenegrin expatriate footballers
Expatriate footballers in Albania
Montenegrin expatriate sportspeople in Albania
Expatriate footballers in Malta
Montenegrin expatriate sportspeople in Malta
Expatriate footballers in Indonesia
Montenegrin expatriate sportspeople in Indonesia